Eyan Mayweather is the fifth studio album by Nigerian rap artist Olamide, released on 23 November 2015. Released through YBNL Nation with studio production from Pheelz, Young Jonn, B Banks and I.D. Cabasa, Eyan Mayweather is the follow up to 2 Kings, a collaborative album by Olamide and Phyno.

Background
Eyan Mayweather was released on 23 November 2015 as Olamide's fifth studio album in five consecutive years, a move that Ovie of NotJustOk described as a “ridiculous level of consistency”. The album was preceded by four songs, which included "Bobo", "Matters Arising", "Lagos Boys" and "Melo Melo".

Track listing

References

2015 albums
Olamide albums
Albums produced by Pheelz
Yoruba-language albums
Albums produced by I.D. Cabasa
Albums produced by Young John (producer)
Albums produced by B.Banks
YBNL Nation albums